Milton Teagle "Richard" Simmons (born July 12, 1948) is an American fitness personality and public figure, known for his eccentric, flamboyant, and energetic personality. He has promoted weight-loss programs, most prominently through his Sweatin' to the Oldies line of aerobics videos.

Simmons began his weight-loss career by opening his gym Slimmons in Beverly Hills, California, catering to the overweight, and he became widely known through exposure on television and through the popularity of his consumer products. He is often parodied and was a frequent guest of late-night television and radio talk shows, such as the Late Show with David Letterman and The Howard Stern Show.

He continued to promote health and exercise through a decades-long career, and later broadened his activities to include political activism – such as in 2008 in support of a bill mandating noncompetitive physical education in public schools as a part of the No Child Left Behind Act.

Simmons's most recent public appearances were in February 2014, and by 2016, speculation and expressions of concern about his well-being began to surface in the media. Both Simmons and his publicist said the concerns were unwarranted, as he simply chose to be less publicly visible.

During the 2020 COVID-19 pandemic, Simmons began to upload archival content to his YouTube channel (recorded before his decision to withdraw from public life) to help people stay fit at home.

Early life
Milton Teagle Simmons was born in New Orleans, Louisiana, on July 12, 1948, to Leonard Douglas Simmons, Sr., and Shirley May (née Satin). He was born to "show-business parents" and raised in the French Quarter of New Orleans. Simmons has an older brother, Leonard, Jr. Their father was raised Methodist and worked as a master of ceremonies and later in thrift stores, while their mother was Russian Jewish and was a traveling fan dancer and later a store cosmetics saleswoman.

Simmons later converted to Catholicism and attended Cor Jesu High School. He attended the University of Louisiana at Lafayette before graduating from Florida State University with a Bachelor of Arts in art.

He became obese during his early childhood and adolescence. He began to overeat and became overweight as early as the age of 4, and by the age of 5, he knew it was perceived negatively. As a young man, he considered being a priest.

In an interview with the Tampa Bay Times, Simmons explained he adopted the name Richard after an uncle who paid for his college tuition. His first job in New Orleans was as a child, selling pralines at Leah's Pralines.

Career

Fitness career
Upon moving to Los Angeles in the 1970s, Simmons worked as the maître d'hôtel at Derek's, a restaurant in Beverly Hills. He developed an interest in fitness. Exercise studios of the day favored the already fit customer, so little help was available for those who needed to gain fitness from an otherwise unhealthy state. He established gyms, and his interest in fitness helped him lose .

He later opened his own exercise studio, originally called The Anatomy Asylum, where emphasis was placed on healthy eating in proper portions and enjoyable exercise in a supportive atmosphere. The business originally included a salad bar restaurant called Ruffage, a pun on the word roughage (dietary fiber), though it was eventually removed as the focus of The Anatomy Asylum shifted solely to exercise. Later renamed "Slimmons", the establishment continued operations in Beverly Hills and Simmons taught motivational classes and aerobics throughout the week. Slimmons closed in November 2016.

In 2010, Simmons stated he had kept off his own 100+ pound (45kg) weight loss for 42 years, had been helping others lose weight for 35 years, and that in the course of his fitness career, had helped humanity lose approximately 12million pounds (5.5 million kg). Simmons used the Internet as a method of outreach by running his own membership-based website and also has official pages on numerous social-networking sites, such as Facebook, Twitter, MySpace, and YouTube.

In media

Simmons began to draw media attention due to the success of his health club that began with him on Real People, where he was shown at work. He introduced customers whom he had helped to lose weight. He later had guest roles on Battlestars, Body Language, Super Password, Win, Lose or Draw, Match Game (ABC), Price Is Right, $25,000 Pyramid, Hollywood Squares (syndicated), and Nickelodeon's Figure It Out.

Positive viewer reactions landed Simmons a recurring role as himself in General Hospital over a 4-year period. This, as well as being in shopping malls, where he taught exercise classes, led to further media attention. In the early 1980s, Simmons hosted two shows Slim Cookin and the Emmy Award-winning talk show The Richard Simmons Show, in which he focused on personal health, fitness, exercise, and healthy cooking. The Richard Simmons Show drew thousands of exercise enthusiasts, including SAG/AFTRA actress Lucrecia Sarita Russo, who reportedly transported an entire bus filled with women from Pam's Figure Tique for a lively workout on the show.

In 1998, Simmons provided the voice of Boone in Rudolph the Red-Nosed Reindeer: The Movie.

He featured as himself on numerous television series, including Whose Line Is It Anyway?, CHiPs, Saturday Night Live, The Larry Sanders Show, and in the Arrested Development episode "Bringing Up Buster." In 1999, he hosted the short-lived television series DreamMaker. In 2007, he filmed the PBS pledge-drive special Love Yourself and Win.

He also featured in television advertisements for Sprint, Yoplait, and Herbal Essence shampoos. In late 2007, he was in a This is SportsCenter commercial on ESPN as the show's "conditioning coach". In Canada, Simmons was in an advertisement for Simmons mattresses. The mattress company hired the exercise celebrity because of the similarity in name, and for his appeal to the company's target audience of women over 35. Beyond this, no further business partnership exists between them.

In the Rocko's Modern Life episode "No Pain, No Gain", Simmons voiced an exercise trainer bearing his animated likeness, leading a class filled with large, anthropomorphic animals.

From 2006 to 2008, he hosted a radio show on Sirius Stars (Sirius Satellite Radio channel 102) titled Lighten Up with Richard Simmons.

 Simmons was a guest on The Rosie O'Donnell Show on November 18, 1997, together with Celine Dion.
 Simmons portrayed himself in Steven Spielberg's 1986 Amazing Stories seasonone, episode10 ("Remote Control Man").
 He was a frequent guest on The Howard Stern Show in the 1980s and 1990s. The two had a brief friendship off the air, which both Simmons and Stern discussed several times on air. While he resolved at one point to refuse future involvement after Stern repeatedly insulted him, he returned to the show on November 16, 2006, then returned again January 24, 2012, and finally September 24, 2013.
 Simmons was also a frequent guest on Late Night with David Letterman (NBC) and the Late Show with David Letterman (CBS). On November 22, 2000, they had a falling out after an incident on that night's show. Simmons (while dressed as a turkey) grabbed Letterman as if to hug or kiss him, and Letterman responded by spraying Simmons with a fire extinguisher which caused Simmons to have a severe asthma attack. Simmons did not appear on the Letterman show for six years, finally returning on November 29, 2006. During that time, Letterman once again set Simmons up for a prank. While Simmons was demonstrating a steamer branded with his name, Letterman insisted on placing a tray under the steamer which Simmons did not believe belonged there. When Simmons turned the steamer on, something in the tray exploded and caught fire, sending Simmons running for his life. Despite the scare, Simmons took the incident in fairly good nature, even joking that he "felt like Michael Jackson" (referring to a mishap where Jackson's hair was accidentally set on fire by pyrotechnics while filming a Pepsi commercial).
 He was a guest on the U.S. version of Whose Line Is It Anyway?.
 Simmons is on tracks 1 and 10 of Bob Rivers's 1997 holiday album More Twisted Christmas.
 Simmons was multiple times on The Glenn Beck Program on HLN.
 He is featured heavily in the film clip of "Hawker Boat" by Tobacco, taken from the album F***** Up Friends.
 He provides the voice for Coach Salmons, a recurring character modeled after his own likeness, for Fish Hooks, a Disney Channel Original Series that premiered on September 24, 2010. Fish Hooks ended after three seasons.
 In 2011, Simmons starred in "Fit to Fly with Richard Simmons", an Air New Zealand inflight safety briefing video modeled after his aerobic workouts.
 In 2012, he was in a Canadian commercial for Telus wireless phone.
 In 2013, he appeared on Extreme Weight Loss as a surprise guest, leading a workout with the contestants.
 In 2021, he was portrayed by American Drag Queen, Tina Burner in the 13th season of Rupaul's Drag Race in the Snatch Game Challenge.

Personal life

Personality
Simmons uses his energetic and motivational demeanor to encourage people to lose weight. His high energy level is always featured in his workout videos. His trademark attire is candy-striped Dolphin shorts and tank tops decorated with Swarovski crystals.

Simmons interacts at a personal level with people using his products. This began by personally answering fan mail he received as a cast member of General Hospital. As of 2008, he personally answered emails and letters and made hundreds of phone calls each week to those seeking his help.

He claimed to have few friends, saying, "I don't have a lot to offer to one person. I have a lot to offer to a lot of people." Aside from his three Dalmatians and two maids, Simmons lives alone in Beverly Hills, California. While his sexual orientation has been the subject of much speculation, he never publicly discussed his sexuality.

In a 2012 interview with Men's Health, he was quoted:

Hurricane Katrina response
In September 2005, Simmons appeared on Entertainment Tonight to discuss the effects of Hurricane Katrina on his family in his hometown of New Orleans, and his involvement in aiding those affected by the hurricane. On August 29, 2006, Simmons was on Your World with Neil Cavuto while making a return visit to New Orleans one year after the flooding, a visit he repeated on March 2, 2007, now talking about his recent trip to Washington, DC, to promote and raise awareness about the Strengthening Physical Education Act of 2007 (H.R. 1224).

Controversies 
In 2004, Simmons slapped a man at Phoenix Sky Harbor International Airport. The altercation took place after the man said, "Hey everybody, it's Richard Simmons, let's drop our bags and rock to the '50s.

In 2008, Bridgestone tires ran a commercial during Super Bowl XLII showing a driver avoiding several hazards while driving at night, including threatening to run down Simmons, who critics argued embodied a homophobic sissy stereotype. Ad Ages critic Bob Garfield described the ad as "grounded in homophobia".

Retreat from public life
Simmons has not made any major public appearances since 2014, and stopped appearing in public altogether in February of that year. In March 2016, speculation began that he was being held hostage by his housekeeper. In response, on March 14, 2016, Simmons gave an audio interview on the Today Show, denying the rumors. In November, the Slimmons fitness gym closed, without any public announcement from Simmons. In February 2017, the podcast Missing Richard Simmons launched, investigating why Simmons left public life so suddenly.

In March 2017, Los Angeles Police Department detectives visited Simmons's home to conduct a welfare check, issuing a statement that Simmons is "perfectly fine" and that "right now he is doing what he wants to do and it is his business." On April 19, 2017, following a hospitalization for severe indigestion, Simmons made his first public comment in over a year, posting on Facebook a photo of himself and the message "I'm not 'missing', just a little under the weather". However, the picture that was included in the post was from as far back as 2013, leading to speculation that the person who posted the message might not actually have been Simmons.

In May 2017, he sued the National Enquirer, Radar Online, and American Media, Inc. for libel and false claims that he was undergoing gender reassignment. In September 2017, Simmons lost the lawsuit, and was ordered to pay the defendants' attorney's fees. The judge ruled, "because courts have long held that a misidentification of certain immutable characteristics do not naturally tend to injure one's reputation, even if there is sizeable portion of the population who hold prejudices against those characteristics, misidentification of a person as transgender is not actionable defamation absent special damages."

In June 2018, he sued a Los Angeles private investigator, claiming he had placed a tracking device over a year earlier on the only vehicle Simmons used for transportation, noting that such tracking is in violation of California law. In July 2018, Simmons amended the suit, alleging the investigator had been hired by In Touch Weekly and prosecutors filed a criminal complaint. In May 2020, a California appellate court upheld a trial judge's decision allowing Simmons' lawsuit to move forward.

In August 2022, in response to continued rumors and a TMZ documentary What Really Happened to Richard Simmons claiming that knee problems forced Simmons out of public life, Simmons issued a statement to the New York Post that he "is happy, healthy, and living the life he has chosen to live."

Print and other media

Books

 Never Say Diet
 Never Say Diet Cookbook
 The Better Body Book
 Deal-A-Meal Cookbook
 Reach for Fitness: A Special Book of Exercises for the Physically Challenged
 Richard Simmons' Never Give Up: Inspirations, Reflections, Stories of Hope
 Farewell to Fat
 Sweetie Pie: The Richard Simmons Private Collection of Dazzling Desserts
 Still Hungry After All These Years: My Story
 The Food Mover Cookbook
 Cookin' on Broadway
 Steam Away the Pounds

Audio

Analog compact cassette
 Project Me (six-tape set)
 Take a Walk
 Take a Hike
 Sweatin' and Sharin With Richard Simmons & Friends
 Walk Across America
 Colors of Your Life (single tape)
 Colors of Your Life (six tape set)
 Secrets of the Winners (single tape)
 Take a Classical Walk
 Walkin' on Broadway
 Walk Around the World
 Never Give Up: Inspirations, Reflections, Stories of Hope (book on tape, read by Simmons)

Compact disc
 Richard Picks the Hits, Volume 1
 Richard Picks the Hits, Volume 2
 Country Cardio
 Oh Happy Day
 Fitness Fiesta
 Wicked Workout
 Big Screen Burn
 Shimmy Into Shape
 In the Mood to Lose
 Classical Chillout

Vinyl record
 Reach (Elektra Records, 1982) - AUS #12

Singles
 This Time (Elektra Records, 45 rpm 1983)

Digital compact cassette
 Colors of Your Life (single tape) (Goodtimes Entertainment, BASF 90 Min. 1998)

Visual media

DVD
 Richard Simmons and the Silver Foxes
 Latin Blast Off
 Mega Mix Blast Off
 Mega Mix 2 Blast Off
 Disco Blast Off
 60's Blast Off
 80's Blast Off
 Blast and Tone
 Disco Sweat
 SuperSweatin': Party Off the Pounds
 SuperTonin': Totally Tonin
 SuperTonin': Totally Tonin' with Toning Rings
 Sit Tight
 Sweatin' to the Oldies
 Sweatin' to the Oldies 2
 Sweatin' to the Oldies 3
 Sweatin' to the Oldies 4
 Sweatin' to the Oldies 5
 Love Yourself and Win
 Boogie Down the Pounds
 Tonin' to the Oldies
 "Richard Simmons Project H.O.P.E. - Health, Optimism, Passion, Energy"

Video cassette
 Everyday with Richard Simmons
 The Stomach Formula
 Get Started
 Reach for Fitness - A Special Video of Exercises for the Physically Challenged
 Deal Your Way to Health
 Richard Simmons and the Silver Foxes
 Sweatin' to the Oldies
 Sweatin' to the Oldies 2
 Sweatin' to the Oldies 3
 Sweatin' to the Oldies 4
 Day By Day (Volumes 1–12)
 Pump and Sweat
 Step and Sweat
 Tone and Sweat
 Stretchin' to the Classics
 Dance Your Pants Off!
 Tonin' Uptown
 Tonin' Downtown
 Groovin' In The House
 The Ab Formula
 No Ifs Ands or Butts
 Love to Stretch
 Blast Off
 Broadway Sweat
 Tone Up On Broadway
 Broadway Blast Off
 Platinum Sweat
 Sit Tight
 Latin Blast Off
 Mega Mix Blast Off
 Mega Mix 2 Blast Off
 Disco Blast Off
 60's Blast Off
 80's Blast Off
 Blast and Tone
 Farewell to Fat
 Disco Sweat
 Sudar Mucho

YouTube
 Fit to Fly
 Hair Do (Official Music Video)

Television/Movies
 The Richard Simmons Show
 Family Feud
 General Hospital
 Late Show with David Letterman
 The Howard Stern Show
 Pictionary
 Password
 The Roseanne Show
 Larry King Live
 Live with Regis and Kathie Lee
 Honey, I Blew Up the Kid
 Richard Simmons Dream Maker
 Wheel of Fortune
 The Wendy Williams Show
 The Ellen Degeneres Show
 Whose Line is it Anyway
 The Doctors

References

Further reading

External links

 
 

 

1948 births
Living people
20th-century American male writers
20th-century American non-fiction writers
21st-century American male writers
21st-century American non-fiction writers
American cookbook writers
American exercise instructors
American health and wellness writers
American male film actors
American male non-fiction writers
American male television actors
American motivational writers
American people of Russian-Jewish descent
American radio personalities
American restaurateurs
American Roman Catholics
Brother Martin High School alumni
Converts to Roman Catholicism
Diet food advocates
Film producers from Louisiana
Florida State University alumni
Television personalities from Louisiana
University of Louisiana at Lafayette alumni
Writers from New Orleans